This list of national highways of Japan contains every national route in Japan.

List of highways

References

National Highways
Highways
 
Transport systems